Elapeedika is a village in the southwestern state of Kerala, India.

Elapeedika - A tangle of nature and history
Towering high, at an altitude of 1000 metre above sea level and lying untrodden and unexplored is a pristine patch of greenery which breathes history-Elapeedika. A green hideout where lush hilly stretches are stitched to perfection with grasslands, Elapeedika in Kannur is an escapist's paradise.

Elapeedika lies surreptitiously in the Western Ghats, away from the march of civilisation, its wild beauty intact. It is believed that the place got its name owing to the presence of several trade outlets though which the Elam (Cardamom) was brought from the hills of Wayanad could be sold. The natives of the region were the Kurichiyars, an ancient tribal community. By the 1930s, the influx of immigrant farmers changed the topography of the place. An agrarian community of around 300 farmer families reside here now.

The place is etched in history as well. It figures among the main regions which witnessed the battle against the British by King Pazhassi Raja, who belonged to the Padinjare Kovilakam of the Kottayam royal family and is of interest to history buffs. One still gets to see the beautiful ruins of the fort, Thalakkal Kotta, built by Thalakkal Chanthu, the commander-in-chief of Pazhassi's army.

With its surreal beauty and vibrant history, Elappeedika is a land just waiting to be explored.

Geography
Elapeedika is situated around 1000 m above sea level, in the Western Ghats range of mountains and is a hill station.

Etymology
The name Elapeedika is derived from the words Elam(i.e., Cardamom) and Peedika(i.e., Shop) There was a lot of cardamom plantation in the olden times.

History
Pazhassiraja's force and East India Company had fought a battle in the 18th century at the Periya pass in Elapeedika.

Transportation
The national highway passes through Kannur town.  Mangalore and Mumbai can be accessed on the northern side and Cochin and Thiruvananthapuram can be accessed on the southern side.  The road to the east of Iritty connects to Mysore and Bangalore.   The nearest railway station is Kannur on Mangalore-Palakkad line. There are airports at Mangalore and Calicut.
Elapeedika is situated on the Iritty Taluk in Kannur District and is the highest place in the district.

Location
Elapeedika is situated near Kolakkad at Peravoor in Iritty Taluk, Kannur district, Kerala state, India. It is the  highest place in Kannur District  and  most beautiful. One can see the whole area of Kannur district and Arabian Sea from here

It has a Roman Catholic church dedicated to St Sebastian and it is the highest church from sea level in Kannur District.

References

Villages near Iritty
Hill stations in Kerala